1999: An Endless Round Of Balls (Parties And Social Events) is the sixth studio album by King Creosote, released in 1999. Speaking of the album Anderson said "It is the correct balance of weird and epic I think. I recorded some of it when I was in a very happy/sad place. It's ace."

Track listing
An Understanding Man 
The Line 
Casino Clubbing 
All Fours 
Reds 
The Blues 
Green Times 
Climbing Trees 
Officer Dribble 
Our Old Times 
Size Matters 
The Last James (Plus Bong's Greatest Hits / ...It's Sad, Here I Am...)

References

1999 albums
King Creosote albums